Nay Ah Shing School, also known as Mille Lacs Band K-12 Schools, is a K-12 tribal school system headquartered in unincorporated Mille Lacs County, Minnesota, with an Onamia postal address. It is affiliated with the Bureau of Indian Education (BIE). It is on the Mille Lacs Indian Reservation.

The divisions include (all of which are in unincorporated areas):
 Nay Ah Shing School (Mille Lacs County, Onamia address) (grades 6-12)
 Abinoojiiyag School (Mille Lacs County, Onamia address) (grades K-5)
 Pine Grove Learning Center (Pine County, Sandstone address) (grades K-5)

The name "Nay Ah Shing" means "on the point".

History
It was established circa 1979 after Native American students had perceived issues with Onamia Public Schools, which previously experienced high dropout rates from Native students. After a March 1975 walkout there was a deal to have Native students spend about half of each school day in Onamia with cultural classes on the reservation taking the remainder, but the time of the latter had decreased. After the Bureau of Indian Affairs (BIA) gave the tribe a $138,000 yearly budget for educational purposes in September 1979, the school opened. The initial enrollment was 49, and Tom Callinan of the Daily Times reported the number of students staying similar up to February 1983, when it had 47 students.

Pat Phelpher of the Minneapolis Star-Tribune wrote that the tribe's chief executive, Arthur Gahbow, "was instrumental in starting the Nay Ah Shing School". In 2001 the enrollment was 110. That year a mural was established on the school grounds honoring the tribe, with every student having a chance to add to the mural.

Curriculum
In 1983 the school had different classes in mornings and afternoons, with core classes in the former and elective courses in the latter.

By 1996 it uses Ojibwe immersion as the method to teach the language.

Student body
In 1983, of the 47 students, five were deemed to be at risk for dropping out, a rate lower than that for Native Americans at the time. In 1983, when the school had a single campus, most of the students lived within walking distance, with school buses serving the remainder.

Staff
In 1983 the school had two Native American teachers and two non-Native American teachers.

References

External links
 Nay Ah Shing School

Native American K-12 schools
Public K-12 schools in the United States
Public elementary schools in Minnesota
Public middle schools in Minnesota
Public high schools in Minnesota
Schools in Mille Lacs County, Minnesota
Schools in Pine County, Minnesota